Pesawur is a village in Afghanistan's Nuristan Province.  It is close to Peshwar a town with the same name.  Most people are Nuristani people.

References 

Populated places in Nuristan Province